Slomka or Słomka may refer to:

Places
 Słomka, Lesser Poland Voivodeship, village in Poland

People
 Jan Słomka (1842–1932), Polish politician
 Marietta Slomka (born 1969), German journalist
 Mirko Slomka (born 1967), German football coach
 Wojciech Słomka (born 1998), Polish footballer

See also